Russian fascism may refer to:

Social phenomena 
 Ruscism, ideology and social practices of the Russian state in the late 20th and early 21st centuries, portmanteaus of the words 'Russian' and 'fascism'
 Russian fascism, ideology developed in 1930s–1940s
 Extremist nationalism in Russia
 Neo-Nazism in Russia
 Putinism

Works 
 Russian Fascism: Traditions, Tendencies, Movements

Organizations 
 All-Russian Fascist Organisation
 Russian Fascist Organization
 Russian Fascist Party
 Russian Women's Fascist Movement